Mallodon dasystomus, the hardwood stump borer, is a species of long-horned beetle in the family Cerambycidae. Specimens range in length from 35mm to 50 mm (1.37 to 1.96 in).

References

Further reading

External links

 

Prioninae
Articles created by Qbugbot
Beetles described in 1824